Electrorides Inc  is an electric vehicle maker, based in Laguna Niguel, California. The company founder and CEO is Tedd Abramson. Electrorides Zerotruck debuted at the Alternative Fuels & Vehicles National Conference and Expo in Las Vegas May 11–14, 2008.

Products 
The Electrorides ZeroTruck is an all-electric truck. It is based on an Isuzu N-series platform, retrofitted with an advanced technology brushless DC electric motor and a lithium-polymer battery 65 kW pack US built. It is a  GVWR medium duty truck with a  range.
The company plans to begin taking orders for the ZeroTruck in January 2009 and to make its first deliveries in June 2009 and recently delivered a ZeroTruck to the City of Santa Monica for their Water Services Dept. (see photo). While most alternative fuel solutions for trucks are hybrids, the ZeroTruck is fully electric.

Competitors 
 Peterbilt Motors, a division of truck manufacturing giant Paccar, sells hybrids not electric trucks.
 Smith Electric Vehicles builds a larger class 6 truck not directly competing head to head.

See also 
 List of production battery electric vehicles

References

External links 

 https://web.archive.org/web/20110710181052/http://www.electrorides.com/aboutus.htm 
 https://web.archive.org/web/20110129032749/http://www.zerotruck.com/Home.html

Plug-in hybrid vehicles
Plug-in hybrid vehicle manufacturers
Battery electric vehicle manufacturers
Electric concept cars
Electric vehicle manufacturers of the United States
Companies based in Orange County, California